Brailovsky,  Brailovski,  Brailowski or Brailowsky is a Slavic masculine surname of Jewish origin, its feminine counterpart is  Brailovskaya or Brailowskaya. It may refer to
Alexander Brailowsky (1896–1976), Ukrainian-born French pianist 
Daniel Brailovsky (born 1958), Argentine-born Israeli footballer and manager
Harry Brailovsky Alperowits (born 1946), Mexican biologist
Leonid Brailovsky (1867–1937), Russian architect, artist, designer, decorator and teacher
Raquel Brailowsky, Puerto Rican anthropologists
Rimma Brailovskaya (1877–1959), Russian painter
Victor Brailovsky (born 1935), Israeli computer scientist, aliyah activist and politician